Latif (also Romanized as Laţīf; also known as Laţīfābād) is a village in Darbandrud Rural District, in the Central District of Asadabad County, Hamadan Province, Iran. At the 2006 census, its population was 160, in 37 families.

References 

Populated places in Asadabad County